Margarya francheti is a species of large operculate freshwater snail, an aquatic gastropod mollusk in the family Viviparidae, the river snails.

Taxonomy
He J.(2013) introduced a new subgenus, Mabillemargarya, for M. francheti; however, this taxonomic act is not supported by comparative morphology and molecular phylogenetics. Therefore, Mabillemargarya is considered as a junior synonym of Margarya.

Distribution 
The distribution of Margarya francheti includes Dian Lake, Erhai Lake, Jianhu Lake in Yunnan Province, China.

Description 
Zhang et al. (2015) provided details about the shell and about the radula.

References

External links
 Zhang L.J. [Le-Jia, Chen S.C. [Shi-Chao], Yang L.T. [Li-Te], Jin L. [Lei] & Köhler F. (2015). Systematic revision of the freshwater snail Margarya Nevill, 1877 (Mollusca: Viviparidae) endemic to the ancient lakes of Yunnan, China, with description of new taxa. Zoological Journal of the Linnean Society. 174(4): 760-800]

Viviparidae
Gastropods described in 1886